Sacramento RT Light Rail is a  light rail system that serves the Sacramento, California area. It consists of three rail lines, 54 stations, and a fleet of 96 vehicles. It is operated by the Sacramento Regional Transit District (RT).

History 

The Sacramento Regional Transit District (also known as simply RT) began planning for a light rail system in the mid-1980s, after the successful opening of the San Diego Trolley in 1981 and amid a surge in light rail construction in mid-sized cities nationwide (Buffalo, Denver, Portland, and San Jose also built systems at the same time).

The first line of the light rail system opened on March 12, 1987. Originally branded as RT Metro, the new line linked the northeastern and eastern corridors which both parallel Interstate 80 and Route 50 respectively with Downtown Sacramento. More specifically, the "starter line" ran between Watt/I-80 and Butterfield stations.

As light rail ridership increased, RT continued to expand the light rail system. In 1993, two infill stations were added on the existing RT Metro line: 39th Street and 48th Street. In September 1998, the line was extended from Butterfield station to Mather Field/Mills station. In September 2003, Sacramento Regional Transit opened the first phase of the South Line (now called the Blue Line), which was a  extension to South Sacramento. In June 2004, light rail was extended from the Mather Field/Mills station to Sunrise Boulevard, and on October 15, 2005, a  extension from the Sunrise station to the city of Folsom was opened.

Sometime in the late 1990s, the RT Metro branding quietly fell into disuse.  It is now simply known as the RT light rail system.

The second phase of the line is planned to reach to the Sacramento International Airport. In August 2015, RT extended service south to Cosumnes River College.

Sacramento RT Light Rail ridership peaked at 16.8 million rides in 2008, but has declined to 9.7 million rides in 2018, a drop of 42% during that period.

System

Lines 
 Blue Line: North Sacramento–Downtown–South Sacramento
 Gold Line: Downtown–East Sacramento–Rancho Cordova–Folsom
 Green Line: Downtown–River District

Headways 
All routes operate every 15 minutes on weekdays and every 30 minutes at night and on the weekend.

Stations 

The stations along the network are open-air structures featuring passenger canopies for protection from adverse weather. Twenty-six stations offer bus transfer services and 22 have park-and-ride lots with a total of 10,113 available parking spaces.

The busiest stations in the system by average daily boardings/alightings are: 16th Street (6,800), University/65th (3,000), Cosumnes River College (2,900), and 29th Street (2,900).

Works of public art included at several stations were developed as part of the RT Public Art Program, and represent an array of media including, mosaics, sculptures, metalwork and murals. Each was commissioned to incorporate an identity and sense of place unique to the neighborhood surrounding the station.

Rolling stock 
The LRV fleet is composed of cars from two different builders: 36 from Siemens-Duewag U2A, some of which have been in use since the RT opened and 40 newer ones delivered in 2003 from Construcciones y Auxiliar de Ferrocarriles USA (CAF USA).

The fleet will be further augmented by at least 28 brand new Siemens S700 series low floor light rail vehicles starting in 2022 with plans to eventually acquire 76 units to replace the existing aging fleet as additional funding is secured.

Former rolling stock 
RT previously operated 20 Urban Transportation Development Corporation (UTDC) ALRV cars. These LRVs were built between 1985 and 1987 for the Santa Clara Valley Transportation Authority, after being withdrawn from use, they were purchased by RT refurbished by Siemens in 2015. In RT service, they carried fleet numbers 301 through 320 They were withdrawn from use in 2022.

Future projects

Level boarding 

The system's five stations constructed after 2006 were designed for low-floor vehicles and will not require modification. The Gold Line stations will be the first to have their platforms raised, followed by the Blue Line stations. SacRT plans to raise platforms in two phases, with half (two car lengths) of a platform (generally four car lengths) taken out of service during construction.

Green Line to Sacramento International Airport 
The Green Line extension to Sacramento International Airport will extend service 12 miles (19.3 km) to the airport via the Natomas neighborhood. The line would extend northwest from the existing Green Line terminus at the 7th & Richards / Township 9 station. The plan to extend light rail to the airport has been in the works since early 1990s and is the project most requested by residents of the Sacramento region. The agency has completed preparing the draft environmental impact report for the project.

The project, estimated at nearly $1 billion, would be the costliest in RT's history and securing funding has been a challenge. Transportation officials most recently proposed funding the project with a half-cent sales tax increase in Sacramento County, but the measure was narrowly defeated in November 2016.

See also 
 Transportation in the Sacramento metropolitan area

References

External links 

 
Passenger rail transportation in California
Light rail in California
Electric railways in California
Railway lines opened in 1987
1987 establishments in California
750 V DC railway electrification